The Yun Yan Building, also known as King's Vision, is a 39-story,  residential skyscraper completed in 2015 and located in Taichung's 7th Redevelopment Zone, Xitun District, Taichung, Taiwan. As of February 2021, it is 24th tallest building in Taichung. The building was constructed under strict requirements of preventing damage caused by earthquakes and typhoons common in Taiwan.

See also 
 List of tallest buildings in Taiwan
 List of tallest buildings in Taichung
 Taichung's 7th Redevelopment Zone

References

2015 establishments in Taiwan
Residential skyscrapers in Taiwan
Skyscrapers in Taichung
Apartment buildings in Taiwan
Residential buildings completed in 2015
Taichung's 7th Redevelopment Zone